Tsuen Wan Sam Tsuen is a village located in the Yau Kom Tau area, west of Tsuen Wan, in Tsuen Wan District, Hong Kong. It lies directly to the east of Yau Kom Tau Village.

Administration
Tsuen Wan Sam Tsuen is one of the villages represented within the Tsuen Wan Rural Committee.

History
As the consequence of the development of Tsuen Wan into a new town in 1965-1966, Kwan Mun Hau village, Ho Bui Village and Yeung Uk Village were relocated to the Tai Wo Hau area. Because of land shortage, some villagers had to move to the land near the then new Yau Kam Tau Village, and formed a new village called 'Tsuen Wan Sam Tsuen'.

References

External links

 Delineation of area of existing village Tsuen Wan Sam Tsuen (Tsuen Wan) for election of resident representative (2019 to 2022)

Villages in Tsuen Wan District, Hong Kong